Walter Omar Serrano (born 2 July 1986) is an Argentine professional footballer who plays as a central midfielder for Maltese Premier League club Lija Athletic.

Career

Club
Serrano began his career in 2008 with Atlético de Rafaela in Primera B Nacional, making his debut on 30 August against Quilmes. In his third appearance for Rafaela, versus Aldosivi, Serrano scored his first career goal. 147 more appearances came Serrano's way between 2008–09 and 2013–14, including 33 appearances during Rafaela's promotion-winning season of 2010–11. In 2013–14, Serrano joined Argentine Primera División side Argentinos Juniors on loan and subsequently went on to participate in 32 matches for the team. He returned to Rafaela in 2014 and then played in 28 games in the next four seasons for them before departing in 2017; throughout his time with Rafaela, he scored nine times. On 9 January 2017, Serrano completed a move to Primera División club Godoy Cruz.

Career statistics

Club
.

Honours

Club
Atlético de Rafaela
Primera B Nacional (1): 2010–11

References

External links
 
 
 Walter Serrano at Goal.com
 Walter Serrano at Futbolparatodos.com.ar
 

1989 births
Living people
Argentine footballers
Argentine expatriate footballers
Association football midfielders
Primera Nacional players
Argentine Primera División players
Peruvian Primera División players
Maltese Premier League players
Atlético de Rafaela footballers
Argentinos Juniors footballers
Godoy Cruz Antonio Tomba footballers
Defensores de Belgrano de Villa Ramallo players
Academia Deportiva Cantolao players
Lija Athletic F.C. players
Argentine expatriate sportspeople in Peru
Argentine expatriate sportspeople in Malta
Expatriate footballers in Peru
Expatriate footballers in Malta
Sportspeople from Santa Fe Province